Jürgen Schmidt (born 11 July 1941) is a retired German speed skater. In 1964 he won three national titles, in 5000 m, 10000 m and all-around, and was selected for the 1964 Winter Olympics, where he finished in 39th place in the 1500 m and 5000 m events. 

Personal bests:
500 m – 43.6 (1964)
 1500 m – 2:14.5 (1964)
 5000 m – 8:16.3 (1964)
 10000 m – 17:04.6 (1964)

References

1941 births
German male speed skaters
Living people
Olympic speed skaters of the United Team of Germany
Speed skaters at the 1964 Winter Olympics
Speed skaters from Berlin
20th-century German people